Hazel Green is an unincorporated community and census-designated place (CDP) in Madison County, Alabama, United States, and is included in the Huntsville-Decatur Combined Statistical Area. As of the 2020 census, the population of the community was 4,105, up from 3,630 at the 2010 census.

History 
The town was named Hazel Green because of the hazel bushes along the road which were of a vibrant green color. In the early 19th century, several farmers from Georgia and the Carolinas settled in Hazel Green after discovering that the area had some of the richest soil in the Southeast. A post office was built in 1819 on the southeast corner of the intersection now known as Hwy. 231-431 and Joe Quick Road. Several grocers and rest stops were also built along this intersection. It became a bustling community and incorporated into a town on June 15, 1821, by an act of the state legislature, with a population of approximately 400. At the time, Hazel Green was a small, rural community that served as a crossroads. Roads connected Hazel Green with Athens to the west, Winchester, Tennessee, to the northeast, Huntsville to the south, and Nashville to the north. These roads intersected at what is now the intersection of US Highway 231/431, Joe Quick Road, and West Limestone Road.

On April 3, 1974, Hazel Green was hit by an F5 tornado during the 1974 Super Outbreak.

As of 2022, Hazel Green is currently undergoing a residential and retail boom, sparked by rampant job growth coming from nearby Huntsville. Hundreds of acres of generational farmland is quickly being replaced with houses, multi-family complexes, fast-food restaurant chains, and various other retail chains. The topic of incorporation to accommodate this sudden explosion of growth is becoming a popular discussion amongst existing residents.

Geography 
Hazel Green is located in northern Madison County at  (34.923712, -86.567206). Hazel Green is bordered to the south by Meridianville and to the southeast by Moores Mill.

The Flint River, a south-flowing tributary of the Tennessee River, runs along the northeast edge of the community.

Major roads 
  U.S. Route 231
  U.S. Route 431

Demographics

2000 census
As of the census of 2000, there were 3,805 people, 1,340 households, and 1,080 families residing in the community. The racial makeup of the community was 93.56% White, 2.65% Black or African American, 1.31% Native American, 0.50% Asian, 0.03% Pacific Islander, 0.32% from other races, and 1.63% from two or more races. 1.76% of the population were Hispanic or Latino of any race.

There were 1,340 households out of which 46.1% had children under the age of 18 living with them, 66.1% were married couples living together, 10.6% had a female householder with no husband present, and 19.4% were non-families. 17.2% of all households were made up of individuals, and 4.9% had someone living alone who was 65 years of age or older. The average household size was 2.82 and the average family size was 3.18.

In the community, the population was spread out, with 31.3% under the age of 18, 7.1% from 18 to 24, 35.3% from 25 to 44, 18.7% from 45 to 64, and 7.7% who were 65 years of age or older. The median age was 33 years. For every 100 females, there were 98.1 males. For every 100 females age 18 and over, there were 95.4 males.
The median income for a household in the community was $40,263, and the median income for a family was $45,174. Males had a median income of $33,005 versus $23,929 for females. The per capita income for the community was $18,397. About 4.2% of families and 6.3% of the population were below the poverty line, including 4.8% of those under age 18 and 12.5% of those age 65 or over.

2010 census 
As of the census of 2010, there were 3,630 people, 1,338 households, and 1,017 families residing in the community. The racial makeup of the community was 88.9% White, 5.9% Black or African American, 1.5% Native American, 0.4% Asian, 0.1% Pacific Islander, 0.7% from other races, and 2.4% from two or more races. 2.3% of the population were Hispanic or Latino of any race.

There were 1,338 households out of which 34.8% had children under the age of 18 living with them, 60.5% were married couples living together, 10.6% had a female householder with no husband present, and 24.0% were non-families. 20.3% of all households were made up of individuals, and 6.2% had someone living alone who was 65 years of age or older. The average household size was 2.69 and the average family size was 3.11.

In the community, the population was spread out, with 26.2% under the age of 18, 7.9% from 18 to 24, 27.9% from 25 to 44, 27.5% from 45 to 64, and 10.5% who were 65 years of age or older. The median age was 37.5 years. For every 100 females, there were 96.5 males. For every 100 females age 18 and over, there were 98.4 males.

The median income for a household in the community was $48,822, and the median income for a family was $60,588. Males had a median income of $42,981 versus $30,990 for females. The per capita income for the community was $23,693. About 10.8% of families and 13.6% of the population were below the poverty line, including 16.4% of those under age 18 and 7.4% of those age 65 or over.

2020 census

As of the 2020 United States census, there were 4,105 people, 1,516 households, and 1,155 families residing in the CDP.

Public services 
The Madison County Sheriff's Department administers law and order in Hazel Green.

The Hazel Green Fire/Rescue is a large volunteer fire department of approximately 40 members serving the residents of North Central Madison County. The fire department has 3 stations. The stations are located throughout the district in strategic locations. Station one, which houses the majority of all of the main rescue, EMS and firefighting equipment, is located at the intersection of Joe Quick Road and Highway 231-431N. Station two is located on Greenville Pike and Station three on Hill Chapel Road. Hazel Green Fire/Rescue outfits an apparatus of five engines, one attack truck (or "brush" truck), one rescue truck and two medical response vehicles. Hazel Green has a dedicated roster of individuals who hold credentials from firefighter I level, to FF 2, state licensed and nationally registered Emergency Medical Technicians (EMTs) and certified technical rescue personnel (vehicle, water and other special rescue missions).

Education
The local school district is Madison County Schools.

The Madison County School System currently runs three schools in Hazel Green. Kindergarten through third grade students attend Hazel Green Elementary School, Lynn Fanning Elementary, and Walnut Grove School. Fourth through sixth grade students attend Moores Mill Intermediate School. Seventh and eighth grade students in Hazel Green attend Meridianville Middle School located in Hazel Green.  Hazel Green High School serves as a high school for ninth through twelfth grade students in Hazel Green, Meridianville, and parts of New Market and northern Huntsville. In September 2022, the Madison County School System announced the proposal of the construction of another school in Hazel Green by the 2024-2025 school years to accommodate new growth, and to prevent overcrowding in Hazel Green’s existing schools. The size, location, and grades to be housed in the proposed school have yet to be announced.

The Huntsville Madison County Public Library maintains a branch, the Tillman D. Hill Public Library, located on Knowledge Dr. behind Advance Auto Parts. This branch library is part of a very well supported community library system in Madison County.

Notable people 
 Kira Lewis Jr., professional basketball player for the New Orleans Pelicans
 George Lindsey, actor who portrayed Gomer Pyle on The Andy Griffith Show and Hee-Haw
 Claire Lynch, bluegrass singer

References

External links 
 Hazel Green unofficial website

Unincorporated communities in Alabama
Census-designated places in Madison County, Alabama
Census-designated places in Alabama
Huntsville-Decatur, AL Combined Statistical Area
Unincorporated communities in Madison County, Alabama